The Public Audit Act 2001 established the Office of the Controller and Auditor-General as an officer of the New Zealand Parliament and reformed and restated the law relating to the audit of public sector organisations.

References

 

Statutes of New Zealand
2001 in New Zealand law
Government audit